New Maynaguri railway station is one of the railway stations which serve Mainaguri in the Jalpaiguri district of West Bengal, the other being Maynaguri Road Railway Station. The station lies on the New Mal–Changrabandha–New Cooch Behar line and New Jalpaiguri–New Bongaigaon section of Barauni–Guwahati line of Northeast Frontier Railway. The station lies on Alipurduar railway division.

Trains
Major trains:
Chennai Egmore-Silghat Town Nagaon Express
Sealdah–Agartala Kanchenjunga Express
Sealdah–Silchar Kanchenjunga Express
Dibrugarh-Howrah Kamrup Express via Guwahati
Dibrugarh–Howrah Kamrup Express Via Rangapara North
Sealdah-New Alipurdiar Teesta Torsha Express
Delhi-Dibrugarh Brahmaputra Mail
Sealdah-Bamanhat Uttar Banga Express
New Jalpaiguri - Bongaigaon Express

Accident
On 13 th January 2022, Thursday, train number 15633 Bikaner–Guwahati Express, travelling from Bikaner Junction to Guwahati railway station got derailed between New Damohani and New Maynaguri railway station near Siliguri in West Bengal at around 4:30pm in the evening.

The railway station

History
Construction of the -long  broad gauge Siliguri–Jogihopa line, between 1963 and 1965, created broad-gauge railway links in North Bengal and Assam.

References

External links
Trains at New Maynaguri

Railway stations in Jalpaiguri district
Alipurduar railway division